Jamie Ginn (born January 7, 1982) was Miss Delaware 2006 and competed in the Miss America 2007 competition, which was won by Lauren Nelson of Oklahoma.

Ginn, originally of Ocean City, New Jersey, had competed previously in the Miss New Jersey competition and placed as First Runner-Up. She was also the fourth runner-up in the 2006 National Sweetheart competition, held annually in Hoopeston, Illinois.

Ginn was a Top 3 Finalist during the reality television special Pageant School, leading up to the Miss America competition.

Her pageant platform was finding a cure for Crohn's disease and colitis.

Ginn holds a Bachelor of Science degree in chemical engineering from Rowan University and works at DuPont.

References

External links

Miss Delaware profile

 

Living people
Miss America 2007 delegates
Rowan University alumni
1982 births
People from Ocean City, New Jersey
American chemical engineers
American women engineers
DuPont people
Participants in American reality television series
Engineers from New Jersey
21st-century women engineers